Marius Frattini (born 20 June 1941) is a French former rugby league footballer who played in the 1960s and 1970s, as a .

Playing career 
He played for Avignon, and later, for Cavaillon and Entraigues. At international level, he also represented France between 1965 and 1973, including at the 1968 and 1972 Rugby League World Cups. Outside the game, he worked as first-aid attendant. He also coached Le Pontet before Guy Vigouroux took over.

References

External links
Marius Frattini at rugbyleagueproject.com

1941 births
Living people
France national rugby league team players
French rugby league players
Rugby league halfbacks
Sportspeople from Vaucluse
Sporting Olympique Avignon players
US Entraigues XIII players